Olga Nikolayeva Skobeleva (née Poltavtseva; ; 11 (23) March 1823 — 6 (18) July 1880) was a Russian philanthropist and hospital organizer. Olga and her family were strongly tied to the Imperial Russian Army; her husband was Russian general Dmitry Ivanovich Skobelev, while Olga was the mother of Russian general Mikhail Dmitrievich Skobelev and the head of the Bulgarian Red Cross. She was killed in Plovdiv, Bulgaria, when her carriage was ambushed by bandits in 1880. A monument was later built on the site of her murder.

References 

Russian philanthropists
1823 births
1880 deaths
Place of birth missing
Red Cross personnel
19th-century philanthropists
19th-century women philanthropists